Joshua Craig Stewart (born December 5, 1978) is a former Major League Baseball pitcher for the Chicago White Sox from -. He also played in the Japanese Pacific League for the Orix Buffaloes in 2005. He last played in 2006 for the Albuquerque Isotopes in the Florida Marlins organization.

External links

1978 births
Living people
Baseball players from Kentucky
Major League Baseball pitchers
Chicago White Sox players
Orix Buffaloes players
American expatriate baseball players in Japan
Bristol White Sox players
Burlington Bees players
Winston-Salem Warthogs players
Birmingham Barons players
Charlotte Knights players
Gulf Coast Marlins players
Albuquerque Isotopes players
Memphis Tigers baseball players